Seven ships of the Royal Navy have been named HMS Archer, named after a person proficient in archery - an archer:

  was a 12-gun gun-brig launched in 1801 and sold in 1815.
  was a wood screw sloop launched in 1849 and broken up in 1866.
  was a torpedo cruiser launched in 1885 and sold in 1905.
  was an  launched in 1911 and sold in 1921.
  was a  launched in 1939 and transferred to the Royal Navy on Lend-lease in 1941. She was later operated by the Ministry of War Transport as Empire Lagan, and was returned to the US in 1945. She was sold into mercantile service and was broken up in 1962.
  is an  launched in 1985 and is currently in service.

See also

Royal Navy ship names